Charles Streynsham Collinson (1753–1831) was an English official of the East India Company who served as the resident of Beauleah. He later returned to England settling in Sproughton near Ipswich. He was High Sheriff of Suffolk from 11 February 1801 to 2 February 1802.

Family life
Charles was the son of Michael Collinson, a noted botanist like his father Peter Collinson. His sister Marianne Collinson was also in India and married Edward Close, a merchant. their son Edward Charles Close was born in Rangamati, British India in March 1790.

References

1753 births
1831 deaths
High Sheriffs of Suffolk